Thomas Pakenham, 5th Earl of Longford, KP, MVO (19 October 1864 – 21 August 1915), known as Lord Silchester until 1887, was an Irish peer and soldier.

Biography
Born in Dublin, Longford was the eldest son of William Pakenham, 4th Earl of Longford, and his wife, the Hon. Selina, daughter of George Rice-Trevor, 4th Baron Dynevor, and succeeded in the earldom on his father's death in 1887. Educated at Winchester College, he served in the 2nd Life Guards, achieving the rank of colonel, and also held the honorary post of Lord-Lieutenant of County Longford from 1887 to 1915. In 1901 he was made a Knight of the Order of St Patrick.

Following the outbreak of the Second Boer War in late 1899, Lord Longford was instrumental in forming a company of volunteers from the Irish Hunt for the Imperial Yeomanry, serving in South Africa. He was formally seconded for service with the Imperial Yeomanry and appointed a captain of the 45th (Dublin) Company on 3 February 1900. The company left for South Africa in the middle of March 1900, and on arrival was attached to the 13th Battalion, Imperial Yeomanry. He was wounded and returned home the following year. In January 1902 he was again seconded for service with the Imperial Yeomanry. He was appointed in command of the 29th Battalion (composed primarily of officers and men from the Irish Horse), with the temporary rank of Lieutenant-colonel (antedated to 1 January 1902), and left Ireland for South Africa in May 1902. As the senior officer, he was in command of almost 1 150 officers and men on board the transport ship Bavarian for the journey. They arrived in South Africa after the end of hostilities, as the Peace of Vereeniging was signed on 31 May, and returned home only four months later, leaving Cape Town on the SS Dilwara which arrived at Southampton in late October. Lord Longford relinquished command of the 29th battalion on their return.

In Dublin, he was a member of the Kildare Street Club.

During the First World War Lord Longford commanded the 2nd South Midland Mounted Brigade of the 2nd Mounted Division, a yeomanry formation, with the rank of Brigadier-General. The Division was initially based in Egypt but was sent dismounted to Suvla on the Gallipoli peninsula as reinforcements during the Battle of Sari Bair. On 21 August 1915 the Division was in reserve for the final attack on Scimitar Hill. When the initial attack by the 29th Division failed, the yeomanry were ordered to advance in the open across a dry salt lake. Raked by shrapnel fire, most of the brigades halted in the shelter of Green Hill but Longford led his brigade in a charge which captured the summit of the hill. As he continued to advance, he was killed. His last words before his death were, reputedly, "Don't bother ducking, the men don't like it and it doesn't do any good…"

Longford's body was never recovered as the British made no further advances before the evacuation of Suvla on 20 December. His grave is marked as a special memorial in Green Hill Cemetery at Suvla.

Family
Lord Longford married Lady Mary Julia Child-Villiers, daughter of Victor Child-Villiers, 7th Earl of Jersey, in 1899. They had two sons and four daughters. He was succeeded in the earldom by his elder son, Edward. His second son, Frank, later succeeded his elder brother and became a prominent Labour politician. Longford's daughters were Lady Violet Pakenham, a writer and critic and the wife of the noted novelist Anthony Powell; Lady Mary Clive, author of Christmas at the Savages and other novels; Lady Pansy Lamb, novelist, biographer, and wife of the painter Henry Lamb; and Lady Julia Mount, mother of Sir Ferdinand Mount. The Countess of Longford died in November 1933, aged 56.

Notes

References 
Kidd, Charles, Williamson, David (editors). Debrett's Peerage and Baronetage (1990 edition). New York: St Martin's Press, 1990, 

1864 births
1915 deaths
Gallipoli campaign
British military personnel killed in World War I
British Army cavalry generals of World War I
British Life Guards officers
Knights of St Patrick
Lord-Lieutenants of Longford
Members of the Royal Victorian Order
Military personnel from Dublin (city)
Thomas
Imperial Yeomanry officers
British Army brigadiers
5